The Ruweng are part of South Sudan's larger Ngok fraternity found in both South Sudan and northern Sudan. The Ngoks consists of Jok, Ruweng and Lual Yak. Ngok is one branch of the eight Dinka groups (namely Rek, Malwal, Ngok, Agaar, Twic, Bor, Padang, and Marbek). The Dinka is the largest Nilotic group in the world.

Location 
Located in South Sudan's Ruweng State, the population of the Ruweng is estimated at 260,000. Ruweng State is bordered by Abyei in the west, Twic in the southwest, Nuer in the south, Shilluk in southeast and the Sudan (Nuba Mountains and Misseriya) from the east to northwest.

Language 
Ruweng speak the Ruweng Ngok Dinka dialect, a subdialect of the Ngok dialect of the Dinka language.

Groups 
The Ruweng have largely moved away from the Ngok identity to establish their own separate identity as Ruweng. This makes the Dinka have nine major groups (Ruweng, Rek, Malwal, Agaar, Twic, Bor, Padang, Marbek, and Ngok). Ruweng sometimes call themselves , which is a short form of Pan-Ruweng. 

The capital of Ruweng State is Pariang. The four major Ruweng groups are Kwel, Awet, Aloor and Paweny (which are found both in Ruweng State and Central Upper Nile State in South Sudan). In Ruweng State, the Ruweng people are divided into 18 chiefdoms. The kwel subclans are Kuocgoor, Agaany, Bibiok, Ngeer, Miorcigiu, Bugo Bol, Bugo Angau, Palei, and Tungdiak. The awet subclans are Aniek, Kuok, and Diar. Ruweng of Aloor (or ) has six subclans: Amaal, Majuan, Thieyier, Ngongkiel, Manteng, and Abang. 

The Ruweng section known as Paweny, located in the Atar County of Central Upper Nile State, left the mainstream Ruweng in 17th century, although they maintain contact with mainstream Ruweng. They have six subclans. Part of Paweny is still in Ruweng State today and has three subclans: Buga e Bol, Tungdiak, and Palei.

External links 
Ruweng People Association

Ethnic groups in South Sudan